Ton(e)s of Hate is the fifth studio album by the Italian extreme metal band Necrodeath.

Track listing
"Mealy-Mouthed Hypocrisy" - 4:28
"Perseverance Pays" - 3:33
"The Mark Of Dr.Z" - 3:26
"The Flag" - 3:22
"Queen Of Desire" - 3:40
"Petition For Mercy" - 3:39
"Last Ton(e)s Of Hate" - 3:34
"Evidence From Beyond" - 4:28
"Bloodstain Pattern" - 7:55

Personnel
Flegias: vocals
Peso: drums
Claudio: guitars
John: bass guitar

References

2003 albums
Necrodeath albums
Scarlet Records albums